Diogo is a Portuguese masculine given name and surname.

People with the first name

Artists and entertainers
Diogo Amaral (born 1981), Portuguese actor
Diogo de Macedo (1889–1959), Portuguese painter, sculptor, and writer
Diogo Dias Melgás (1638–1700), Portuguese composer
Diogo Dória (born 1953), Portuguese actor
Diogo Infante (born 1967), Portuguese actor
Diogo Morgado (born 1981), Portuguese actor
Diogo Nogueira (born 1981), Brazilian singer-songwriter

Sportsmen
Diogo Amado (born 1990), Portuguese footballer
Diogo Andrade (born 1985), Portuguese footballer
Diogo António Alberto (born 1989), Mozambican footballer
Diogo Antunes de Oliveira (born 1986), Brazilian footballer
Diogo Barbosa Mendanha (born 1992), Brazilian footballer
Diogo Campos Gomes (born 1990), Brazilian footballer
Diogo Caramelo (born 1992), Portuguese footballer
Diogo Carreira (born 1978), Portuguese basketball player
Diogo Carvalho (born 1988), Portuguese swimmer
Diogo Castro Santos (born 1969), Brazilian racing driver
Diogo Correa de Oliveira (1984–2021), Brazilian footballer
Diogo Coutinho (born 1977), Portuguese rugby union player
Diogo da Costa Oliveira (born 1988), Brazilian footballer
Diogo Dalot (born 1999), Portuguese footballer
Diogo da Silva Farias (born 1990), Brazilian footballer
Diogo de Lima Barcelos (born 1985), Brazilian footballer
Diogo dos Santos Lima (born 1985), Brazilian footballer
Diogo Douglas Santos Andrade Barbosa (born 1984), Brazilian footballer
Diogo Fernandes (born 1985), Brazilian footballer
Diogo Ferreira (born 1989), Australian footballer
Diogo Figueiras (born 1991), Portuguese footballer
Diogo Fonseca (born 1984), Portuguese footballer
Diogo Galvão (born 1982), Brazilian footballer
Diogo Gama (born 1981), Portuguese rugby union player
Diogo Gaspar (born 1992), Portuguese footballer
Diogo Gonçalo Baptista Pires (born 1993), Portuguese footballer
Diogo Jefferson Mendes de Melo (born 1984), Brazilian footballer
Diogo Jota (born 1996), Portuguese footballer
Diogo Lamelas (born 1990), Portuguese footballer
Diogo Leite (footballer, born 1989), Portuguese footballer
Diogo Leite (footballer, born 1999), Portuguese footballer
Diogo Lézico da Silva (born 1983), Portuguese footballer
Diogo Luís Santo (born 1987), Brazilian footballer
Diogo Malaquías da Silva (born 1988), Brazilian footballer
Diogo Manuel Gonçalves Coelho (born 1992), Portuguese footballer
Diogo Mateus (born 1980), Portuguese rugby union player
Diogo Matos (born 1975), former Portuguese footballer
Diogo Miguel Alves Luís (born 1980), Portuguese footballer
Diogo Moniz (born 1993), Portuguese footballer
Diogo Orlando (born 1983), Brazilian footballer
Diogo Pinheiro (born 1990), Brazilian footballer
Diogo Pinto (footballer) (born 1999), Portuguese footballer
Diogo Pires (Brazilian footballer) (born 1981)
Diogo Ramos (born 1986), Portuguese footballer
Diogo Rincón (born 1980), Brazilian footballer
Diogo Rodrigues Siston (born 1981), Brazilian-Portuguese footballer
Diogo Rosado (born 1990), Portuguese footballer
Diogo Salomão (born 1988), Portuguese footballer
Diogo Santos Rangel (born 1991), Brazilian-born East Timorese footballer
Diogo Santos (born 1984), Portuguese footballer
Diogo Sclebin (born 1982), Brazilian Olympic triathlete
Diogo Silva (footballer, born 1986) (born 1986), Brazilian footballer
Diogo Silva (taekwondo) (born 1982), Brazilian taekwondo practitioner
Diogo Silvestre Bittencourt (born 1989), Brazilian footballer
Diogo Soares Gomes (born 1985), Brazilian footballer
Diogo Sousa Ribeiro (born 1991), Portuguese footballer
Diogo Tavares (born 1987), Portuguese footballer
Diogo Valente (born 1984), Portuguese footballer
Diogo Viana (born 1990), Portuguese footballer
Diogo Vila (born 1990), Portuguese footballer
Diogo Yabe (born 1980), Brazilian swimmer

Explorers, settlers, and colonial administrators
Diogo Álvares Correia (aka Caramuru) (1475-1557), Portuguese settler in the colony of Brazil
Diogo Cão (1452–1486), Portuguese navigator who discovered the Congo River and Angola
Diogo da Rocha (fl. 1525), Portuguese explorer
Diogo de Melo (fl. 1565–1568), Captain-major of Portuguese Ceylon
Diogo de Melo Coutinho (fl. 1552–1572), Captain-major of Portuguese Ceylon
Diogo de Melo de Castro (fl. 1633–1638), Governor of Portuguese Ceylon
Diogo de Silves (fl. 1427), Portuguese explorer
Diogo de Teive (fl. 1451–1474), Portuguese explorer
Diogo Dias (fl. 1497–1501), Portuguese explorer
Diogo Fernandes Pereira (fl. 1503–1507), Portuguese navigator and explorer
Diogo Gomes (1420–1500), Portuguese navigator, explorer and writer
Diogo Homem (1521–1576), Portuguese cartographer
Diogo Ribeiro (cartographer) (fl. 1518–1533), Portuguese cartographer and explorer
Diogo Rodrigues (1490–1577), Portuguese explorer

Nobles
Diogo de Azambuja (1432–1518), Portuguese noble
Diogo Fernandes (count) (fl. 928), count in the Kingdom of León
Diogo I Nkumbi a Mpudi (fl. 1545–1561), king of Kongo
Diogo Lopes de Sequeira (1465–1530), Portuguese noble
Diogo, Constable of Portugal (1425–1443), Portuguese royal prince
Diogo, Duke of Viseu (1450–1484), Portuguese noble

Politicians
Diogo Antônio Feijó (1784–1843), Brazilian regent and Catholic priest
Diogo de Barcelos Machado Bettencourt (1847–1922), Portuguese politician and judge
Diogo de Freitas do Amaral (born 1941), Portuguese politician
Diogo Pinto (activist) (born 1974), Mozambican Secretary General of the EMI
Diogo Vasconcelos (1968–2011), Portuguese politician

Others
Diogo Abreu (geographer) (born 1947), Portuguese geographer
Diogo das Chagas (1584–1661), Portuguese Franciscan friar and historian
Diogo de Arruda (fl. 1490–1531), Portuguese architect
Diogo de Boitaca (1460–1528), Portuguese architect and engineer
Diogo de Couto (1542–1616), Portuguese historian
Diogo de Gouveia (1471–1557), Portuguese theologian and diplomat
Diogo de Mendonça Corte-Real (1658–1736), Portuguese diplomat and statesman
Diogo de Teive (humanist) (1514–1569), Portuguese humanist
Diogo Mónica, Portuguese-American engineer and entrepreneur 
Diogo Ortiz de Villegas, (1457-1519) Castilian priest

People with the surname

Sportsmen
Carlos Diogo (born 1983), Uruguayan footballer
Igor Diogo Moreira Araújo (born 1987), Portuguese footballer
Ivo Diogo (1935–2009), Brazilian footballer
João Diogo Serpa Meira (born 1987), Portuguese footballer
João Diogo (born 1988), Portuguese footballer
Jordão Diogo (born 1985), Portuguese footballer
Márcio Diogo (born 1985), Brazilian footballer
Nuno Diogo (born 1981), Portuguese footballer
Paulo Diogo (born 1975), Swiss footballer
Víctor Diogo (born 1958), Uruguayan footballer
Zé Diogo (born 1994), Portuguese footballer

Others
José Diogo Quintela, Portuguese comic actor, from the group Gato Fedorento
Luísa Diogo (born 1958), Prime Minister of Mozambique from 2004 to 2010

See also
 Diego
 Diogo (disambiguation)

Portuguese masculine given names